Guesstimation is a BBC National Lottery game show which was broadcast on BBC One from 11 July to 29 August 2009. It was hosted by Nick Knowles.

Format
In the show two families try to out-guess each other to win a holiday, with the help of challenges performed by celebrity and Olympic guests.

Ratings

References

External links

2009 British television series debuts
2009 British television series endings
2000s British game shows
BBC television game shows
British game shows about lotteries
Television series by Banijay
Television series by ITV Studios